Purdom is a surname. Notable people with the surname include:

Charles Purdom (1883–1965), British author
Edmund Purdom (1924–2009), British actor
Thomas L. Purdom (1892–?), Scottish World War I flying ace
Tom Purdom (born 1936), American writer
William Purdom (1880–1921), British plant explorer